Chin Up Buttercup is a 2007 album by Holly McNarland.

Track listing
So Cold (McNarland)
Fly (McNarland/Wozniak)
DaDaDa (McNarland)
Sweet Lazy (McNarland)
Every Single Time (McNarland)
Dear Pain (McNarland)
Dry as a Bone (McNarland)
Bye Bye Boy (McNarland)
Mermaid (McNarland)
The Waltz (McNarland/Wozniak)
Memory of a Man (McNarland)
Sad Songs (McNarland)

2007 albums
Holly McNarland albums